Galaxy of Stars (1936) is a promotional short film released by Metro-Goldwyn-Mayer only for MGM exhibitors in Europe and Africa, featuring Laurel and Hardy, and rediscovered in 2005.

Made in 1936, the 8.5-minute film presents about three minutes of Laurel and Hardy promoting eight MGM films, none of which feature the duo. The film is dubbed in French, with much of the comedy revolving around a telescope. Also featured in the clip was Laurel and Hardy regular James Finlayson playing their foil.

References

1936 films
Metro-Goldwyn-Mayer short films
American black-and-white films
1936 short films
American comedy short films
Laurel and Hardy